Ekubo is a Nigerian surname. Notable people with the surname include:

Alexx Ekubo (born 1986), Nigerian actor and model
Henry Ekubo (born 1982), Nigerian former footballer

Surnames of Nigerian origin